Saky or Saki is a town of regional significance in Ukraine, in the Crimean peninsula. Although it is the administrative centre of the Saky Raion, it does not belong to the raion (district), serving instead as the center and the only locality of Saky Municipality. Population:

History
The exact origin of the present town of Saky is unknown. At the time of the Crimean Khanate, Saky was a small village. In 1805, Saky had less than 400 people, more than 95 percent of whom were Crimean Tatars. In 1827, the first bathhouse was built and ten years later an office of the military hospital of Simferopol.

During the Crimean War, the allied forces landed near Saky between Saky Lake and Kyzyl-Yar Lake and besieged Sevastopol. At the beginning of February  1855, the troops of General Stepan Aleksandrovich Khroulev focused on Saky before attacking the enemy in the fortifications of Evpatoria. The village was completely destroyed by bombing.

After the Crimean War, during the second wave of emigration of Crimean Tatars, the Tatar population of Saky abandoned the ruined village. In 1858, migrants from the region of Poltava settled there, followed a little later by the Greeks of Constantinople.

In February 1945, the British and American delegations at the Yalta conference landed at Saky Airport.

Saky city council member Oleg Kolodyazhny (Our Ukraine) was shot dead in Saky on June 29, 2010.

A series of explosions occurred at the nearby Saky air base on August 9, 2022.

Economy and Industry 
 Jodobrom § Iodobrom, bromine iodine and other halogens halides and other different chemicals
 Saky Chemical Plant, Chemical Industry, various chemicals production
 Saki CHP thermal plant was recently updated enhanced output with an PGU GTE25P gas turbine units

Education 

 Agricultural College (Branch), Crimean Federal University

Gallery

References

External links

 
Cities in Crimea
Saky Municipality
Cities of regional significance in Ukraine
Port cities of the Black Sea